Oktyabrsky is an urban locality (an urban-type settlement) in Mikhaylovsky District of Ryazan Oblast, Russia. Population:

References

Urban-type settlements in Ryazan Oblast
Ryazan Governorate